The following is a list of annual leaders in assists in Major League Baseball (MLB), with separate lists for the American League and the National League. The list also includes several professional leagues and associations that were never part of MLB.

In baseball statistics, an assist (denoted by A) is a defensive statistic, baseball being one of the few sports in which the defensive team controls the ball. An assist is credited to every defensive player who fields or touches the ball (after it has been hit by the batter) prior to the recording of a putout, even if the contact was unintentional. For example, if a ball strikes a player's leg and bounces off him to another fielder, who tags the baserunner, the first player is credited with an assist. A fielder can receive a maximum of one assist per out recorded. An assist is also credited if a putout would have occurred, had another fielder not committed an error. For example, a shortstop might field a ground ball cleanly, but the first baseman might drop his throw.  In this case, an error would be charged to the first baseman, and the shortstop would be credited with an assist.

Rabbit Maranville is the all-time leader in assists with 8,967. Frankie Frisch holds the record for most assists in a season with 643 in 1927. Marcus Semien is the active leader in assists and has led the league 4 times.



American League

National League

American Association

National Association

Union Association

Player's League

Federal League

References
Baseball-Reference.com

Major League Baseball statistics
Major League Baseball lists